Gemma Bolognesi (4 November 1894 – 26 March 1983) was an Italian actress. She appeared in more than thirty films from 1916 to 1954.

Biography
Bolognesi began acting at an early age and made her debut with the ensemble of the Teatro Manzoni in Milan under Marco Praga. Further seasons of her stage career were alongside Enzo Biliotti (1921) and from 1922 to 1926 the Teatro del Popolo (as its first actress from 1924), again in Milan. The following season saw her in the theater company around Luigi Zoncada and later, in 1932, next to Carlo Tamberlani.

Bolognesi had made her film debut in 1916 in Cura di baci by Emilio Graziani-Walter, but found little satisfaction with it, so she concentrated on her theater work. It was not until the mid-1930s, when the time of the big stage roles was over, that she developed into a sought-after character actress playing cultured women, who with her appearance with her blonde, luscious hair also gave her secondary roles the flair of "the Italian Mae West". After World War II she continued her film career until 1954 and then withdrew to her birthplace.

In the 1930s, Bolognesi also worked frequently for the EIAR, the Italian radio service.

Selected filmography

References

Bibliography

External links 

1894 births
1983 deaths
Italian film actresses
Italian stage actresses
20th-century Italian actresses